The 2016 D1 Grand Prix series is the sixteenth season for the D1 Grand Prix series and the eleventh for the D1 Street Legal spinoff series. The season began on March 26 at Odaiba Tokyo Street Course for the D1GP and ended on October 23 at the same course with Daigo Saito winning his second Championship and began on April 16 for D1SL at Bihoku Highland Circuit. and ended on November 20 at Nikko Circuit with Katsuhiro Ueo winning his first D1SL Championship by cancellation, due to a fatal incident that happened during morning practice.

Schedule

Drivers' rankings

D1GP

References

External links
  

D1 Grand Prix seasons
D1 Grand Prix